Carrazedo can refer to the following parishes in Portugal:
 Carrazedo (Amares)
 Carrazedo (Bragança)

see also
 Carrazeda de Ansiães